Yambes is a Torricelli language of Papua New Guinea spoken mostly by older adults. There is little data to classify it, and it is therefore left unclassified within Torricelli by Ross (2005).

It is spoken in Yambes village of Dreikikier Rural LLG, East Sepik Province.

References

Torricelli languages
Languages of East Sepik Province